Józef Żiżka (11 March 1913 – 28 October 1975) was a Polish footballer. He played in two matches for the Poland national football team from 1934 to 1936.

References

External links
 

1913 births
1975 deaths
Polish footballers
Poland international footballers
Place of birth missing
Association footballers not categorized by position